Agustín Yáñez Delgadillo (May 4, 1904 in Guadalajara, Jalisco – January 17, 1980 in Mexico City) was a Mexican writer and politician who served as Governor of Jalisco and Secretary of Public Education during Gustavo Díaz Ordaz's presidency. He is the author of numerous books and the recipient, in 1952 as member of the Academia Mexicana de la Lengua, in 1973, of the Premio Nacional de las Letras. Al filo del agua (On the Edge of the Storm) is universally acknowledged as his masterpiece, according to the Encyclopedia of Latin American and Caribbean literature, 1900-2003 By Daniel Balderston, Mike Gonzalez, page 616.

Education and teaching profession
Yáñez studied law in the Escuela de Jurisprudencia de Guadalajara and philosophy in the National Autonomous University of Mexico (UNAM). He held several teaching positions throughout his life, he was a professor in the Escuela Normal para Señoritas de Guadalajara from 1923 to 1929, in the Preparatoria José Paz Camacho from 1926 to 1929, in the Preparatoria de la Universidad de Guadalajara from 1931 to 1932, in the Escuela Nacional Preparatoria from 1932 to 1953, in the UNAM from 1942 to 1953 and again from 1959 to 1962. He entered El Colegio Nacional in 1952.

Writings

Essays
Fray Barlolomé de las Casas, el conquistador conquistado (1942)
El contenido social de la literatura iberoamericana (1943)
Alfonso Gutiérrez Hermosillo y algunos amigos (1945)
El clima espiritual de Jalisco (1945)
Fichas mexicanas (1945)
Yahualica (1946)
Discursos por Jalisco (1958)
La formación política (1962)
Moralistas franceses (1962)
Proyección universal de México (1963)
Días de Bali (1964)
Conciencia de la revolución (1964)
Dante, concepción integral del hombre y de la historia (1965)
Discursos al servicio de la educación pública (1964,1965,1966)

Narratives
Por tierras de Nueva Galicia (1928)
Baralipton (1931)
Espejismo de Juchitán (1940)
Genio y figuras de Guadalajara (1941)
Flor de juegos antiguos (1942)
Esta es mala suerte (1945)
Melibea, Isolda y Alda en tierras cálidas (1946)
Los sentidos del aire, Episodios de Navidad (1948)
Tres cuentos (1964)

Novels
Archipiélago de mujeres (1943)
Pasión y convalecencia (1943)
Al filo del agua (1947)
La creación (1959)
La tierra pródiga (1960)
Ojerosa y pintada (1960)
Las tierras flacas (1962)
Perseverancia final (1967)
Las vueltas del tiempo (1973)
La ladera dorada (1978)
Santa Anna, espectro de una sociedad (1981 concluded AD)

Political career
Agustín Yáñez was a member of the Institutional Revolutionary Party (PRI).  He served as Governor of Jalisco from 1953 to 1959, undersecretary of the President of the Republic from 1962 to 1964 and Secretary of Public Education from 1964 to 1970.  He headed the Mexican delegation to UNESCO's 11th general assembly in 1960.

See also
Statue of Agustín Yáñez
Yahualica de González Gallo

References

Further reading

 (PDF)

1904 births
1980 deaths
Members of El Colegio Nacional (Mexico)
Members of the Mexican Academy of Language
Writers from Guadalajara, Jalisco
Institutional Revolutionary Party politicians
Mexican Secretaries of Education
Governors of Jalisco
National Autonomous University of Mexico alumni
Academic staff of the National Autonomous University of Mexico
University of Guadalajara alumni